Goesti Pangeran Harjo Djatikoesoemo (1 July 1917 – 4 July 1992) was an Indonesian army officer and diplomat who served as the first Chief of Staff of the Indonesian Army (1948–1949) and Ambassador to Singapore (1958–1960). He was a member of Surakarta Royal Family, the 23rd son of Pakubuwono X. His body was buried in the royal graveyard at Imogiri in Bantul, Yogyakarta. 

He was recognized as a National Hero of Indonesia in 2002.

Early life and education 

Djatikoesoemo was born in Surakarta, on 17 July 1917, the second son of Sultan Pakubuwono X.

References 

1917 births
1992 deaths
Ambassadors of Indonesia to France
Ambassadors of Indonesia to Malaysia
Ambassadors of Indonesia to Morocco
Ambassadors of Indonesia to Singapore
Chiefs of Staff of the Indonesian Army
Indonesian collaborators with Imperial Japan
Members of Pembela Tanah Air
National Heroes of Indonesia
Transport ministers of Indonesia